Post-growth is stance on economic growth concerning the limits-to-growth dilemma — recognition that, on a planet of finite material resources, extractive economies and populations cannot grow infinitely. The term "post-growth" acknowledges that economic growth can generate beneficial effects up to a point, but beyond that point (cited as $25,000 GDP/capita by Richard Wilkinson and Kate Pickett in their book The Spirit Level) it is necessary to look for other indicators and techniques to increase human wellbeing.

Post-growth can be distinguished from similar concepts and movements (such as degrowth and steady-state economy) in that it seeks to identify and build on what is already working, rather than focusing on what is not. Post-growth advocates try to encourage, connect and further develop already existing ideas, concepts, technologies, systems, initiatives, and actions. In this way, "post-growth" does not specify the answer to the limits-to-growth challenge, as "steady state economics" and "degrowth" attempt to do, but rather, seeks to understand and address this challenge from an evolving complex systems perspective. With this perspective, post-growth deals with all aspects of self and society (such as psychology, human nature, human evolution, cultures, social systems and economies) and the interrelation of all of these aspects. Accordingly, the post-growth concept also advocates solutions that are appropriate with regards to place, time, resource and cultural factors. Therefore, post-growth initiatives take shape in very different ways under different circumstances.

Post-growth can be considered an asset-based approach to community development — applied not only to community development but across a wide range of categories — in response to limits-to-growth challenges, as it seeks to identify and build on cultural and technological assets to facilitate the emergence of post-growth futures. In his landmark work Prosperity Without Growth (Routledge, 2017), the economist Tim Jackson demonstrates that building a ‘post-growth’ economy is indeed a "precise, definable and meaningful task". Starting from clear first principles, he sets out the dimensions of that task: the nature of enterprise; the quality of our working lives; the structure of investment; and the role of the money supply.

Foundational points 
The foundational points that connect "post-growth" perspectives are:

 Acknowledging limits to economic and population growth.
 Recognising that, due to these limits, it is necessary to embrace shifting beyond economic growth as a goal.
 Shifting focus from current metrics of success such as GDP to new ones such as Gross national happiness (GNH), the Happy Planet Index, and/or other well-being indices.
 Using wisdom gained in the growth-based economic era (and before it) in order to transcend to sustainable futures.
 Thinking and acting according to values of cooperation, sharing, social justice and ecological stewardship, on local as well as global levels.

Post-growth initiatives 

A main concept present in the post-growth movement is that there is not one post-growth future, but a diverse range of post-growth futures that can unfold simultaneously.

There is an increasing number of post-growth-oriented initiatives that are emerging in order to create prosperity in locally resilient, self-sufficient ways. Often these initiatives have come about as a response to sustainability issues. One example of a post-growth initiative is the Transition Movement, which seeks to create local resiliency in the context of peak oil and climate change (Transition Network). Voluntary simplicity (also known as simple living) and downshifting are also growing trends that can be considered post-growth. Tiny homes, ecovillages, and Quakers are good examples of how voluntary simplicity can be put into practice (see the Testimony of Simplicity). Post-growth ideas and actions are gaining international attention in the mainstream media, as The Guardian and Treehugger both featured articles about the post-growth movement in 2012.

Free Money Day is an annual, global post-growth event, in which people give away money to strangers as a way of sparking dialogues and critical thinking about money, peoples' relationships with money, and the value of economics based on sharing.

In 2012, the Post Growth Institute released the (En)Rich List, a parody of the Forbes List of Billionaires that aimed to highlight influential post-growth thinkers “whose collective contributions enrich paths to sustainable futures”.

Related organizations 

There are many organizations worldwide that are dealing explicitly with ideas about how to move beyond the growth-centered paradigm. These include: the Post Growth Institute; the Center for the Advancement of the Steady State Economy; the Center for a New American Dream; Centre for the Understanding of Sustainable Prosperity (CUSP), the Danish Degrowth Network; Degrowth Vancouver; the Donella Meadows Institute; Feasta: The Foundation for the Economics of Sustainability, Growthbusters; Gund Institute for Ecological Economics; the Institute for Studies in Happiness, Economy and Society; the International Society for Ecological Economics; Mouvement Quebecois pour une Decroissance Conviviale; New Economics Foundation; New Economics Institute; the Population Institute; Population Media Center; the Post Carbon Institute; Research and Degrowth; the Simplicity Institute; the Transition Culture (Transition Towns); The Zeitgeist Movement; and Via Campesina.

See also 

 Club of Rome
 Deep ecology
 Ecological economics
 Genuine progress indicator
 Happiness economics
 Humanistic economics 
 The Limits to Growth
 Participatory economics
 Political ecology
 Post-consumerism
 Power Down: Options and Actions for a Post-Carbon World
 Prosperity Without Growth
 Slow Movement
 Steady-state economy
 The Path to Degrowth in Overdeveloped Countries
 Tim Jackson (economist)
 Traditional trades
 Uneconomic growth
 Universal Basic Income

References 

Economic growth
Economics of sustainability
Social economy